Davahchi is a village in West Azerbaijan Province, Iran.

Davahchi or Davehchi, also rendered as Davechi, may also refer to:
 Davahchi-ye Olya, Ardabil Province
 Davahchi-ye Sofla, Ardabil Province